Sprite Animation Studios is a Los Angeles, CA-based CGI animation studio founded in 2002 by former members of Square USA led by Motonori "Moto" Sakakibara, co-director of Square Pictures and Columbia Pictures’ feature film Final Fantasy: The Spirits Within. The studio specializes in the design and creation of 3D computer animation for film and television productions, video games, and commercial advertising, and its short productions have screened at the Annecy International Animated Film Festival, the SIGGRAPH Electronic Theater, the Ottawa International Animation Festival, and other venues.

In 2009, Sprite entered into a partnership with OLM, Inc., a famous Japanese animation studio, producer of Pokémon.

Television series
Pac-Man and the Ghostly Adventures (2013–2016) (co-production Arad Productions, 41 Entertainment, Bandai Namco Entertainment, and Namco and OLM, Digital)
Sushi Ninja (2014) (co-production with Genco)
Yo-Kai Watch (2015–2018) (co-production with OLM, Digital)
Kong: King of the Apes (2016–2018) (co-production Arad Animation, 41 Entertainment and OLM, Digital)

Films
Yo-kai Watch: The Movie (2016)

References

External links
 

American animation studios
Mass media companies established in 2002
Privately held companies based in California
Imagica Robot Holdings